The village Vale de Gouvinhas is situated in a valley on the right bank of the river Tuela in the municipality of Mirandela, Portugal. The population in 2011 was 319, in an area of 17.14 km². It borders the villages Abambres (5 km), Vale de Telhas (2 km), Bouça and Cabanelas (3 km). The centre of Mirandela lies at 20 km.

Naming
The toponym Vale de Gouvinhas seems an anthroponym, that is, it seems to come from the name of a person. Historians believe that this person is of Germanic origin (Ganda), but they can not specifically identify the name. In the second century appeared the name "Gaudin" (Latin). In 1150 the name called "Goubina (Goubinas?) appears in the Curia of Dom Afonso Henriques. Both names can be related to the toponym Gouvinhas, for the third hypothesis, by phonetic evolution in the merging patronymic "Gaudilaci" of Gaudila and Gouvia. What is clear that the name Gouvinhas is old.

History
This location, taking account of the archeology of Torre de Dona Chama, the fort and the fortifications, point to a settlement in the pre- and proto-history. The current village dates from the twelfth century. From a religious point of view, Vale de Gouvinhas and the neighboring villages form a union since the fifteenth century. It is erected by the abbey of Saint Mammes in Guide through the establishment of a church and a parish, appointed by the Curia. From a royal perspective, a notable from Torre de Dona Chama was ruler. Administratively, these villages formed the "Terra de Ledra" and there was, for a period of domination by Torre de Dona Chama, a division of the land in the form of "reviews" (twelfth or thirteenth century). It remained a part of the province Torre de Dona Chama to October 24, 1855, the date the province ceased to exist. Currently it is part of the municipality Mirandela.

Heraldry
Coat of Arms: Red shield, a jolted golden grapevine, foliated and golden tendrils, silvery fruit, under a cross of the Sovereign Military Hospitaller Order of Saint John of Jerusalem of Rhodes and of Malta on top of silver and blue waived stripes. Silver mural crown with three towers. White listel with caption in black: "Vale de Gouvinhas".

Flag: white. Silver and red cord and tassels. Golden rod and spear.

Seal: according to the law with caption: "Union of villages of Vale de Gouvinhas - Mirandela".

Festivals and Fairs

External links and sources 
 Portuguese Wikipedia article
 Vale de Gouvinhas web site

References

Freguesias of Mirandela
Villages in Portugal